Vesica (plural vesicae) is Latin for "bladder", may refer to:

Anatomy 
 Vesica, mainly used for the urinary bladder
 Vesica, also used for the gallbladder
 Vesica, in entomology used for a part of the male genitals
 Trigonum vesicae urinariae, Latin for trigone of urinary bladder

Shapes 
 Vesica piscis, a shape formed by the intersection of two circles of the same radius